Lincoln High School (LHS) was a school in McClellanville, in rural Charleston County. It is a part of the Charleston County School District.

LHS has an enrollment of 260 students.  It was founded in 1954.  Starting in the 2014 school year, LHS became a grade 6 through 12 high school.

Lincoln High School closed after the 2015–2016 school year.

In 2016 school district staff stated that they were considering having a new Lincoln High built in Awendaw.

References

External links
School website

Public high schools in South Carolina
Schools in Charleston County, South Carolina
Public middle schools in South Carolina